Toropuku is a genus of lizards in the family Diplodactylidae endemic to New Zealand. It includes two species:

Toropuku stephensi (Robb, 1980) – Stephen’s sticky-toed gecko, Stephens Island gecko, striped gecko
Toropuku inexpectatus Hitchmough, Nielsen, & Bauer, 2020

References

 
Lizard genera
Taxa named by Stuart V. Nielsen
Taxa named by Aaron M. Bauer
Taxa named by Todd R. Jackman
Taxa named by Rod A. Hitchmough
Taxa named by Charles H. Daugherty